The Black Raven is a 1943 American mystery film directed by Sam Newfield. It was produced and released by Producers Releasing Corporation, a leading Poverty Row studio.

Plot
A heavy storm catches everybody, nearly all with good reasons for fleeing the US, at the Black Raven motel just across the U.S./Canada border, and one of them winds up dead. The motel is run by a Mr. Bradford, who seems to have a sinister past. The others are an escaped convict with plans on Bradford's life, a bank employee who has embezzled $50,000, a young couple that has eloped and, for comic relief, a not-too-bright county sheriff.

While Bradford is hardly a saint, he suspects the murderer is planning to frame him for the crime. When the irate and disagreeable father of the eloping woman turns up, Bradford sacrifices his life to catch the murderer and see to it that the eloping couple can start a new life with his stash of money.

Cast
George Zucco as Amos Bradford aka The Raven
Wanda McKay as Lee Winfield
Robert Livingston as Allen Bentley
Noel Madison as Mike Bardoni
Byron Foulger as Horace Weatherby
Charles B. Middleton as Sheriff
Robert Middlemass as Tim Winfield
Glenn Strange as Andy
I. Stanford Jolley as Whitey Cole
Jimmy Aubrey appears uncredited as Roadblock Watchman.

Critical reception
Leonard Maltin called the film a "paltry (and obvious) whodunit," awarding it 1.5 out of 4 Stars.

External links

1943 films
American mystery films
American black-and-white films
Producers Releasing Corporation films
1943 mystery films
1940s English-language films
Films directed by Sam Newfield
1940s American films